Huafan University (HFU) is an institute of higher education founded by members of the Buddhist community in Shiding District, New Taipei, Taiwan. The university consists of 4 colleges, 12 departments, 12 graduate institutes, and 5 research centers.

History
Huafan University was founded in 1990 as the Hua Fan Institute of Technology. In 1993, the name was changed to the Hua Fan College of Humanities, Science and Technology.  In 1997, the school was conferred the status of university by the Taiwan Ministry of Education and the name was changed to its current name of Huafan University.

Founder

Before her ordination, the Ven. Hiu Wan, or Yu Wan-shan, was one of the most acclaimed female Chinese brush painters of the 20th century. Under the guidance of Kao Chien-fu, the master of the Ling-nan School, she majored in art at Kwangtung College of Humanities and Technology and later at the Art College of Hong Kong. For years, she had been a visiting professor to Tagore University in India, where she taught in the Art Department and had traveled extensively. She had studied and reproduced the most representative mural paintings at Ajanta and had held art exhibitions all over the world. She was renowned for her Ch'an or Zen paintings and her invention of the modern Buddhist scriptural illustrations.

As prestigious as she had been after her ordination, she resolved never to build a temple or be an abbess. Education had always been her primary concern. Once she said, "Education is my life. I will be with it as long as I can breathe." She had founded both Tien-tai School and Hui-hai School in Hong Kong before being invited to Taiwan in 1966 to direct the Graduate Institute of Buddhism at the College of Chinese Culture. In the years to follow, she founded the Lotus Buddhist Seminary and the Institute for Sino-Indian Buddhist Studies and had hosted the International Conference on Buddhist Education and Culture. In 1990, Huafan University was founded in fulfillment of her ideals—the education of enlightenment and the integration of humanities and technology.

For her singular achievement in education, arts, religion, and writing, the Ven. Hiu Wan was awarded the Cultural Medal, the nation's highest civic honor, by the government in 1997. In October 2004, she died, but her ideals and her long-lasting influence on education will remain forever.

Education philosophy

The name of the university, Huafan, comes from the Chinese characters Hua (華), meaning Chinese culture, and Fan (梵), meaning Buddhism.  This is intended to highlight the integration of 5,000 years of Chinese culture and 3,000 years of Buddhist philosophy to educate people with professional and technical knowledge to provide a service to society. Huafan University's goal as an educational institution is to help students improve themselves through self-education, or the "Education of Enlightenment" as advocated by its founder, the Ven. Hiu Wan. This involves self-awakening, self-development, and human-oriented education based on Chinese ethics and Buddhist compassion. Through this path of education, Huafan University’s objectives are to promote its students' academic competency and personal integrity, to help them achieve wisdom and compassion, and ultimately to benefit humankind as a whole. By integrating Hua (Chinese culture) and Fan (Buddhism) in education, these objectives will become one step closer.

Location and environment

Huafan University is located at the top of a small mountain in Shiding District. Atop Dalun Peak, with an elevation of 550 meters, it is reportedly "the highest" university in Taiwan (i.e., in terms of elevation). There are scattered Sanyou plum, bamboo and pine trees on the surrounding hills.

The road linking the campus to the city is torturous: to walk from the town of Shiding would be very time-consuming and athletic; wending traffic and the steep incline of the roads would make bicycle transportation difficult (if not dangerous).  The vast majority of students reach the campus by taking Bus 666; there is more than one bus route under the number 666, but this does link the campus to downtown Taipei (in a journey of more than one hour, each way, even in good weather).

The campus is self-sufficient in many respects and has a vegetarian restaurant, in addition to small shops, so that students and staff do not have to commute for minor needs.

Faculties
 College of Arts and Design
 College of Buddhism
 College of Engineering and Management
 College of Liberal Arts

University presidents

 Yu Jie Ming (于傑民): August 1990 - January 1991
 Guo Rong Zhao (郭榮趙): February 1991 - July 1992
 Tian Bo Yuan (田博元): August 1992 - July 1995
 Ma Xun Jiao (馬遜): August 1995 - July 2005
 Yan Wei Mou (顏維謀): August 2005 - January 2010
 Jue Jien-Ming (朱建民): January 2010 - July 2015
 Kao Poyuan  (高柏園): January 2015 -July 2018
 Lee Kao Poyuan (李天任): August 2018 - Current

International academic exchange

Huafan University has academic exchange programs with the following schools:

Lawrence Technological University
Morehead State University
University of North Carolina at Pembroke
Marylhurst University
Lewis-Clark State College
University of New England

De Montfort University

University of Wollongong
University of South Australia

Uiduk University
Geumgang University

International Buddhist University

Paris 8 University

See also
 List of universities in Taiwan

References

External links
 
 

1990 establishments in Taiwan
Buddhist universities and colleges in Taiwan
Educational institutions established in 1990
Universities and colleges in New Taipei
Universities and colleges in Taiwan
Comprehensive universities in Taiwan